Tit for Tat is a 1935 short comedy film starring Stan Laurel and Oliver Hardy. It is the only direct sequel they made, following the story of Them Thar Hills, which was released the previous year and includes the same two supporting characters, Mr. and Mrs. Hall, portrayed by Charlie Hall and Mae Busch. This "two-reeler" is notable too for being nominated for an Academy Award as Best Live Action Short Film (Comedy) of 1935, although it did not win. It also has a central theme similar to the comedy duo's 1929 silent short Big Business. In the opening scene of Tit for Tat, Oliver places a sign in the front window of his and Stan's electrical store. It reads "Open for Big Business", an allusion to the escalating revenge and "reciprocal destruction" common to both films.

Plot
Laurel and Hardy establish an electrical goods store, Laurel and Hardy's Electrical Supplies, next door to Charlie Hall's grocery store. They go next door to introduce themselves.

Hall, still sulking and suspicious from their previous encounter with the liquor-spiked well water in Them Thar Hills, mistakenly thinks that Hardy is trying to romance his wife (Mae Busch). While Stan and Ollie are out a customer helps himself to an electric clock, greeting them as he leaves.

An accident with a ladder and a raising platform in the pavement lands Ollie on Mrs Hall's bedroom window when he tries to replace light bulbs in their sign. Mr Hall confronts Ollie. Ollie complains to Stan that his character has been "smirched" and he goes to Mr Hall to demand an apology. He gets hit on the head with a spoon and Hall follows them back to their shop. He grabs Ollie by the nose with hot hair tongs.

The two business partners now leave their shop, again without closing its door, to retaliate in Hall's grocery. They spring lemon meringue pie into his face.

Meanwhile, the shoplifter (Bobby Dunn) continues to remove items from their electrical store, later taking more and more as their confrontations with Hall escalate. At first the thief openly carries items out by hand; but since Stan and Ollie are distracted by their conflicts with Hall and largely ignore him, the shoplifter begins using a wheelbarrow to take away merchandise. Ollie fills Hall's till with syrup: Hall uses the meat-slicer to take off the top of Ollie's bowler hat. They then stick a huge tin of lard onto Hall's head. Hall starts to wreak havoc in their shop. Stan and Ollie cover Hall with eggs.

A policeman finally arrives and halts all the personal assaults and retaliations, getting them all to shake hands. Laurel and Hardy return to their store and find it virtually empty. The shoplifter has returned yet again, although this time with a large truck to haul away all the remaining items. As Stan and Ollie watch in silent disbelief, the shoplifter greets them cheerfully and strolls out of their store carrying a lamp, which he puts in the back of the truck.

Cast
 Stan Laurel as Stan
 Oliver Hardy as Ollie
 Mae Busch as Mrs Hall
 Charley Hall as Mr. Hall, the grocer
Uncredited:
 Bobby Dunn as shoplifter
 Baldwin Cooke as customer
 James C. Morton as policeman
 Jack Hill as passerby
 Viola Richard as passerby

Reception
The short was popular with audiences in 1935 and was generally well received by critics and theater owners. Variety, the entertainment industry's leading trade paper at the time, gives the film high marks in its March 27 issue. In its review of Tit for Tat, the paper also alludes to news reports that Laurel and Hardy's partnership had recently ended due to Stan's recurring disputes with producer Hal Roach:

The Film Daily, another widely read trade publication in 1935, was impressed by all the "Grand Laughs" in Tit for Tat. In its March 23 review, the paper welcomes what it views as the comedy duo's return to broad physical comedy and, like Variety, draws special attention to the shoplifter's role in the film:

Motion Picture Herald, yet another influential trade publication in 1935, gives the film a somewhat restrained, clinical assessment in its March 10 issue, describing the short as a "Good Comedy" with "numerous laugh-provoking situations". In addition to providing reviews and news about the film industry, Motion Picture Herald regularly published the reactions of theater owners or "exhibitors" to the features and shorts they presented. Their reactions to Tit for Tat were mixed, although most were very positive. "A lot of laughs", reports Roy Irvine, owner of the Ritz Theatre in Ritzville, Washington, while H. G. Stettmund of the H. and S. Theatre in Chandler, Oklahoma, describes it "the best these boys have made for a long time." Some theater owners, however, considered the film to be a mediocre production and only a modest box-office draw. C. L. Niles, the owner of Niles Theatre in Anamosa, Iowa, was not impressed with the short. In the April 20 issue of Motion Picture Herald, he grades it "Just fair" and remarks that his theater simply "got by" in screening it, suggesting that the film, as least in Anamosa, had not been very successful in boosting ticket sales. In Eminence, Kentucky, the owner of that town's cinema, A. N. Miles, found it to be a decidedly weak comedy. "Not a good laugh in the whole two reels", he complains in the July 13 issue of Motion Picture Herald.

References

External links 
 
 
 

1935 films
1935 comedy films
American black-and-white films
Films directed by Charley Rogers
Laurel and Hardy (film series)
Metro-Goldwyn-Mayer short films
1935 short films
American comedy short films
1930s English-language films
1930s American films